The list of shipwrecks in March 1824 includes some ships sunk, foundered, grounded, or otherwise lost during March 1824.

1 March

2 March

3 March

4 March

5 March

6 March

7 March

8 March

9 March

10 March

11 March

12 March

13 March

15 March

16 March

17 March

18 March

21 March

22 March

23 March

24 March

25 March

27 March

29 March

30 March

31 March

Unknown date

References

1824-03